Sindurmati Dighi is located on the border of Kurigram district and Lalmonirhat district in Sindurmati Mauza on 16.5 acres of land. Dighi is a sacred pilgrimage site for Hindus. During the renovation of this dighi in 1975 by government initiative, many ancient coins and idols were found which are now preserved in the Bangladesh National Museum.

History and Nomenclature 
It is said that a Hindu Zamindar Raj Narayan Chakraborty dug this lake to have a child. When her two daughters were born, they were named Sindur and Moti. But after the excavation of the pond is completed, it is seen that the water is not rising.. After realizing his dream, the zamindar organized a puja on the Navami day. Puja is organized right in the middle of the Dighi. His two daughters Sindur and Moti were staying there. Before the end of the puja, the water started to rise suddenly. Even though everyone got ashore, Sindur and Moti sank in the water. Later the zamindar dreams that his two daughters attain divinity and attain immortality. Since then the name of this lake is Sindurmati. Over time, the name of that place became Sindurmati.

Temples 
Temples established in Sindurmati Dighi: 

 Durga Temple
 Krishna Temple
 Vishnu Temple
 Rama Temple
 Kali Temple

Sindurmati Fair 
Every year on the ninth tithi of Chaitra month, a big fair and other pujas are held in this site. On this occasion, the area becomes resplendent with the arrival of a significant number of Hindu pilgrims from different parts of Bangladesh. Many devotees from the neighboring country of India also attend this fair.

Others 
Every year on the last day of the month of Kartik, Punya Deepdan ceremony is held at this ancient and traditional bathing ghat of Sindurmati. Other pujas held here are Krishno Janmashtami,  Radhashtami etc. A religious library is also established here at present.

Gallery

References

External Links 

Hindu temples in Lalmonirhat district
Hindu temples in Kurigram district
Tourist attractions in Bangladesh
Archaeological sites in Rangpur division
Hindu pilgrimage sites in Bangladesh
Durga temples
Krishna temples
Vishnu temples
Rama temples
Kali temples